Shirkers is a 2018 British-American documentary film by Singapore-born filmmaker Sandi Tan about the making of an independent thriller featuring a teenage assassin set in Singapore. It premiered at the 2018 Sundance Film Festival in January and won the World Cinema Documentary Directing Award, making her the second Singapore-born filmmaker after Kirsten Tan (Pop Aye, 2017) to win an award at the festival. It was also nominated for the Gotham Independent Film Award for Best Documentary.

Shirkers was released on October 26, 2018, on Netflix.

Synopsis
In the summer of 1992, 19-year-old Sandi Tan, alongside friends Jasmine Ng and Sophia Siddique, as well as film teacher and mentor Georges Cardona, shot the independent film Shirkers in Singapore. After wrapping, Tan, Ng, and Siddique left the footage with Cardona as the trio went to study abroad for college. However, Cardona disappeared with the footage and the trio never saw him again; Tan did receive two brief, inconsequential taped messages via snail mail.

On September 11, 2011, four years after Cardona's death in 2007, Cardona's ex-wife emailed Tan, informing her that she was in possession of the footage for Shirkers, minus the audio tracks. In the proceeding years, Tan decided to digitize the footage and use it to make something new - a documentary about the process of lensing, and then losing, the original 1992 film.

Interviews were conducted in 2015 with Tan's friends, people involved with the making of Shirkers, and people who knew Cardona. The interviewees were Sophia Siddique Harvey, Jasmine Ng, Sharon Siddique, Philip Cheah, Ben Harrison, Foo Fung Liang, Pohshon Choy, Tay Yek Keak, Grace Dane Mazur, Stephen Tyler, and Georges Cardona's ex-wife.

Georges Cardona 
Around 1976 in New Orleans, Georges Cardona, a John F. Kennedy High School attendee, photography mentor to David Duke, and Vietnam War veteran, opened Lighthouse Media Center (a franchisee of Cambridge, Massachusetts-based Super-8 Sound, a retrofitter of Beaulieu Super 8 film cameras). Cardona was the cinematographer for some of David Duke's electoral campaign commercials and, in New Orleans in 1988, for Stephen Tyler's The Last Slumber Party.

Reception

Critical reception
The site's consensus reads: "Shirkers uses one woman's interrogation of a pivotal personal disappointment to offer affecting observations on creativity, lost opportunity, and coming to terms with the past." On Metacritic, the film has a weighted average score of 88 out of 100 based on 20 critics, indicating "universal acclaim"; it is labeled as a "Metacritic must-see".

Citing the film as one of his favorites at Sundance, Nick Allen of RogerEbert.com wrote a rave review for Shirkers, saying that "Tan presents her multifaceted life story—vibrant, unbelievable, and full of such incredible women—as a dazzling tapestry that’s unlike many narrative or documentary films."

Accolades

See also
Cinema of Singapore
Guerrilla filmmaking
Cinephilia

References

External links
 
Rolling Stone review of the film
Christian Science Monitor review of the documentary film

2018 films
American documentary films
British documentary films
Singaporean documentary films
Netflix original documentary films
Films set in the 1990s
Films set in 1992
Sundance Film Festival award winners
2018 independent films
Films set in Singapore
2010s English-language films
2010s American films
2010s British films